The Eighth Voyage of Sindbad is a play by Bahram Beyzai written in 1964.

Text 
The text was commissioned by Jafar Vali to be based on a one act piece by Parviz Natel-Khanlari.

References 

Plays by Bahram Beyzai
1964 plays
Persian-language books
Works based on Sinbad the Sailor